Karl Albrektsson ((born September 27, 1993), is a Swedish  mixed martial arts fighter, competing in the Light Heavyweight division of Bellator MMA. He has been performing at a professional level since 2012, and he is also known for his participation in the tournaments of fighting organizations Bellator MMA and Rizin FF.  As of March 14, 2023, he is #10 in the Bellator Light Heavyweight Rankings.

Background 
Albrektsson was born and raised in Stockholm. As a teenager, he easily got into trouble, but tried to keep himself in the loop via  hockey and boxing. Hockey, which is also a physical sport, suited him well, already as a 15-year-old he was 1.88 tall and weighed over 90 kilos.

In March 2019, he said in an interview that he wanted to wait with the UFC debut and why he did not aim for UFC Stockholm. He would like to have more experience and "be as mature as he can" when he debuts there.

Wushu 
In 2014, Albrektsson participated in Wushu - European Championships in Bucharest and won Sweden's first European Championship gold on the men's side.

MMA

Early career 
Albrektsson made his debut in the Polish organization MMA Koszalin and won his first match via finish in the second round. It took a little over a year after the debut before the next match ended.

International Ring Fight Arena 
Albrektsson started playing matches within the Swedish organization IRFA in 2013 and went undefeated, 3–0, through his time with them for a total result of 4-0 and was then picked up by the Japanese organization Rizin FF.

Rizin Fighting Federation 
He made his debut on 17 April 2016 in Rizin 1, played a hard and even match against the Russian sambo world champion and later Bellator champion, Vadim Nemkov who Albrektsson finally defeated via a split decision.

On September 25 of the same year, Karl faced Valentin Moldavsky at Rizin World Grand Prix 2016: 2nd RoundMoldavsky was the first to defeat Albrektsson in the latter's professional career. He did so by unanimous decision in an open-weight bout.

Just over ten months later, it was time for Karl's next bout on July 30, 2017, at Rizin Fighting World Grand Prix 2017 Opening Round Part 1. This time against Lithuania Teodoras Aukstuolis who Albrektsson defeated via submission. 

At the World Grand Prix second match of the tournament on December 29, 2017, Albrektsson met  Czech Jiří Procházka who defeated him via TKO and knocked him out of the tournament. 

After that match, according to Albrektsson himself, he and Rizin had some trouble agreeing on matches. Instead, Karl competed at Superior Challenge at SC 17 against Dmitry Tebekin and at SC 18 on December 1, 2018, against Josh Stansbury. He defeated both via stoppage

Albrektsson was supposed to meet Conor McGregor's club mate,  Irishman Chris Fields 11 May at SC 19,  but on May 3, 2019, it was reported that Albrektsson was forced to withdraw from the match due to injuries.

His next bout for Rizin came against Wanderlei Silva's student Christiano Frohlich at Rizin 15 on April 21, 2019, which Albrektsson won by unanimous decision.

Bellator MMA 
On July 30, 2019, it was announced that Albrektsson was signed to Bellator MMA. Bellator was in contact with Albrektsson already in 2013, but he wanted to get a little more experience before signing for a larger organization and therefore waited until 2019.

Albrektsson debuted in the organization on October 25, 2019, at Bellator 231 against former Light heavyweight Phil Davis in the co-main bout. Davis relied on his wrestling background and took down Albrektsson in rounds 1 and 2. In round 3, Davis beat Albrektsson with body blow and finished Albrektsson against the cage.

Albrektsson faced Viktor Nemkov, the brother of his previous opponent, at Bellator 257 on April 16, 2021. He won the bout via unanimous decision.

Albrektsson was scheduled to face Julius Anglickas on October 16, 2021, at Bellator 268. After Anglickas replaced Anthony Johnson in the LHW Grand Prix, Albrektsson instead faced Dovletdzhan Yagshimuradov. He won by unanimous decision.

As the first fight of his new multi-fight, multi-year contract, Albrektsson faced Karl Moore on September 23, 2022 at Bellator 285. He lost the fight via face crank submission in the second round.

Albrektsson faced Grant Neal on February 4, 2023 at Bellator 290. He lost the bout via split decision. 4 out of 6 media scores gave it to Albrektsson.

Mixed martial arts record

|-
|Loss
|align=center|13–5
|Grant Neal
|Decision (split)
|Bellator 290
|
|align=center|3
|align=center|5:00
|Inglewood, California, United States
|
|-
|Loss
|align=center|13–4
|Karl Moore
|Submission (face crank)
|Bellator 285
|
|align=center|2
|align=center|3:36
|Dublin, Ireland
|
|-
|  Win
| align=center | 13–3
|Dovletdzhan Yagshimuradov	
|Decision (unanimous)
|Bellator 268 
|
|align=center|3
|align=center|5:00
|Phoenix, Arizona, United States 
|
|-
|  Win
| align=center | 12–3
| Vladimir Mishchenko
|TKO (punches)
|Superior Challenge 22
|
|align=center|1
|align=center|3:46
|Stockholm, Sweden 
|
|-
|  Win
| align=center | 11–3
| Viktor Nemkov
|Decision (unanimous)
|Bellator 257
|
|align=center|3
|align=center|5:00
|Uncasville, Connecticut, United States 
|
|-
|  Win
| align=center | 10–3
| Amilcar Alves
| TKO (punches)
| Superior Challenge 21
| 
| align = center | 2
| align = center | 2:46
| Stockholm, Sweden
|
|-
|  Loss
| align = center | 9–3
| Phil Davis
|TKO (punches and elbows)
|Bellator 231
|
|align=center|3
|align=center|3:06
|Uncasville, Connecticut, United States
|
|-
|  Win
| align = center | 9–2
| Christiano Frohlich
| Decision (unanimous)
| Rizin 15
| 
| align = center | 3
| align = center | 5:00
|Yokohama, Japan
|
|-
|  Win
| align = center | 8–2
| Josh Stansbury
|KO (punches)
|Superior Challenge 18
|
|align=center|1
|align=center|4:56
|Stockholm, Sweden
|
|-
|  Win
| align = center | 7–2
| Dmitry Tebekin
| TKO (punches)
| Superior Challenge 17
| 
| align = center | 2
| align = center | 4:52
| Stockholm, Sweden
|
|-
|  Loss
| align = center | 6–2
| Jiří Procházka
| TKO (punches)
| Rizin World Grand Prix 2017: 2nd Round
| 
| align=center|1
| align=center|9:57
| Saitama, Japan
|
|-
|  Win
| align = center | 6–1
| Teodoras Aukstuolis
| Submission (arm-triangle choke)
| Rizin World Grand Prix 2017 Opening Round Part 1
| 
| align = center | 1
| align = center | 8:01
| Saitama, Japan
|
|-
|  Loss
| align = center | 5–1
| Valentin Moldavsky
| Decision (unanimous)
| Rizin World Grand Prix 2016: 1st Round
| 
| align=center| 2
| align=center| 5:00
| Saitama, Japan
|  
|-
|  Win
| align = center | 5–0
| Vadim Nemkov
| Decision (split)
| Rizin 1
| 
| align=center| 3
| align=center| 5:00 
|Nagoya, Japan
|
|-
|  Win
| align = center | 4–0
| Tomasz Janiszewski
| Submission (rear-naked choke)
| International Ring Fight Arena 7
| 
| align = center | 2
| align = center | 4:37
| Solna, Sweden
|
|-
|  Win
| align = center | 3–0
| Nordine Hadjar
| KO (punches)
| International Ring Fight Arena 6
| 
| align = center | 1
| align = center | 2:29
| Solna, Sweden
|
|-
|  Win
| align = center | 2–0
| Arunas Vilius
| Submission (rear-naked choke)
| International Ring Fight Arena 5
| 
| align = center | 1
| align = center | 2:34
| Solna, Sweden
|
|-
|  Win
| align = center | 1–0
| Blazej Nagorski
| TKO (punches)
| MMA Koszalin: Poland vs. Sweden
| 
| align = center |2
| align = center |3:54
| Koszalin, Poland
|
|}

See also 
 List of current Bellator fighters
 List of male mixed martial artists

References

External links 
  

1993 births
Living people]
Swedish male mixed martial artists
Swedish sanshou practitioners
Light heavyweight mixed martial artists
Mixed martial artists utilizing sanshou
Bellator male fighters